Mary Bell (born 1957) is an English woman who at age 11 was convicted of the manslaughter of two younger boys.

Mary Bell may also refer to:
 Mary A. Bell (1873–1941), African-American artist
 Mary Hayley Bell (1911–2005), English actress, writer and dramatist
 Mary Bell (aviator) (1903–1979), Australian aviator
 Mary Bell (Civil War nurse) (1840–?), American nurse
 Mary Bell (politician) (1885–1943), Scottish politician
 Mary L. Bell (1901–1995), first African-American to own and operate a radio station in the city of Detroit, Michigan
 Mary Bell, disguised herself as a man and fought in the American Civil War for the Confederacy, see Mary and Molly Bell
 Mary Bell (1844–1874), Christian missionary, see Mary and Annie Bell

Fiction
 Floral Magician Mary Bell, a 1992 anime series, or its title character, Mary Bell
 Marybell, a main character in the manga Poe no Ichizoku by Moto Hagio
 Marybell, a manga by Kimiko Uehara

Bell, Mary